WEMI is a Christian radio station broadcasting on 91.9 FM, licensed to Appleton, Wisconsin serving the Fox Cities. WEMI is also heard in Fond du Lac and Ripon through translators on 101.7 FM. WEMI's format consists of Christian adult contemporary music with some Christian talk and teaching.  WEMI is owned by Evangel Ministries, Inc. and also owns radio station WEMY 91.5 FM in Green Bay with a translator station in Two Rivers, WI 107.5 FM.  And WGNV 88.5 FM in central Wisconsin  with Translator stations in Antigo, WI at 94.1 FM. and Waupaca WI at 107.3 FM.

Translators

External links 
WEMI's website

EMI